The William Swain House, at W. W. Main St. in Pullman, Washington, is an American Craftsman style bungalow house built in 1914.  It was a home of architect William Swain who was elected mayor of Pullman in the year the house was completed.  It was listed on the National Register of Historic Places in 1994.

It is a balloon-frame, spacious house on an east-facing slope.

See also
Pullman Flatiron Building, also designed by Swain and surviving in Pullman
United Presbyterian Church (Pullman, Washington), NRHP-listed, also designed by Swain and surviving in Pullman

References

National Register of Historic Places in Whitman County, Washington
Houses completed in 1914
American Craftsman architecture in Washington (state)
Pullman, Washington